Sir Francis Gordon Lowe, 2nd Baronet (21 June 1884 – 17 May 1972) was a British male tennis player.

Lowe is best remembered for winning the Australasian Championships in 1915 (where he beat champion Horace Rice in the final). and for winning the World Covered Court Championships (Indoor) in 1920. Lowe also won Queen's Club in 1912, 1913 and 1925. His father, Sir Francis Lowe, 1st Baronet, was a Member of Parliament, representing Birmingham Edgbaston. In 1929 Lowe became Sir Gordon Lowe, succeeding his father to the baronetcy. Gordon's brother Arthur Lowe was also a tennis player and another brother, John, played first-class cricket.

He was ranked World No. 8 in 1914 by A. Wallis Myers of The Daily Telegraph.

In 1910 he won the singles title at the British Covered Court Championships, played at the Queen's Club in London, defeating his brother Arthur in the final in three straight sets. He won the singles title at Monte Carlo three times, in 1920, 1921, 1923 and the South of France Championships in 1923.  He also competed at the 1912 Summer Olympics and the 1920 Summer Olympics.

From 1932 to 1936 he was the editor of the Lowe's Lawn Tennis Annual.

Grand Slam finals

Singles (1 title)

Doubles (3 runner-ups)

References

 Bud Collins: Total Tennis - The Ultimate Tennis Encyclopedia (2003 Edition).

External links
 
 
 
 Tennis trophies go under the hammer

1884 births
1972 deaths
Australasian Championships (tennis) champions
Baronets in the Baronetage of the United Kingdom
English male tennis players
People from Edgbaston
Grand Slam (tennis) champions in men's singles
Olympic tennis players of Great Britain
Tennis players at the 1912 Summer Olympics
Tennis players at the 1920 Summer Olympics
British male tennis players
Tennis people from the West Midlands (county)